John W. Henderson is an American engineer, United States Army engineer officer, and government official. He served as Assistant Secretary of the Air Force (Installations, Environment & Energy) in the Trump administration. His nomination by President Donald Trump was confirmed by the U.S. Senate on February 15, 2018. Prior to his nomination, Henderson most recently served in the U.S. Army as the Commander of the Omaha District, Army Corps of Engineers. He has over 23 years of active military experience as an Army engineer officer, including serving two combat tours to Iraq and one combat tour to Afghanistan as an engineer battalion task force commander.

References

External links

Biography at U.S. Air Force
Biography at U.S. Army Corps of Engineers

Living people
South Dakota School of Mines and Technology alumni
Trump administration personnel
United States Army officers
United States Army personnel of the Iraq War
United States Army personnel of the War in Afghanistan (2001–2021)
21st-century American engineers
Year of birth missing (living people)